The Vauxhall VXR8 is a performance car marketed by Vauxhall in the United Kingdom between 2007 and 2017, based on two different models produced by Holden Special Vehicles: the HSV Clubsport (2007–2009) and HSV GTS (2010–2017). The VXR8 is the successor to both the Vauxhall Monaro VXR and the Vauxhall Omega/Carlton.

In 2009, the  VXR8 Bathurst and supercharged  'S' editions were offered using the same Gen IV LS2 V8 but with a Walkinshaw Performance supercharger in the Bathurst S. They were named for the famous Bathurst race in Australia.

In 2013, the VXR8 GTS (based on the HSV GTS Gen-f) was introduced with a  supercharged Gen IV 6.2 litre LSA engine, also used in the second generation Cadillac CTS-V and fifth generation Chevrolet Camaro ZL1.

In 2017, the VXR8 was discontinued due to the closure of Holden's Australian factories and discontinuation of the HSV GTS. It was effectively replaced by the less powerful GSi version of the second generation Vauxhall Insignia.

References 

Vxr8
Sports sedans